Last of the Independents is the sixth studio album by English-American rock group the Pretenders, released in 1994. For this album, the band is officially credited as being Chrissie Hynde (vocals, guitar), Adam Seymour (guitar), Andy Hobson (bass) and Martin Chambers (drums). However, this line-up only plays together on one track ("All My Dreams"); the rest of the album is performed by Hynde and Seymour in conjunction with a rotating series of musicians on bass and drums. These musicians include Hobson and Chambers, as well as bassists Andy Rourke, Tom Kelly and David Paton, and drummers Jimmy Copley and J.F.T. Hood. A few other session musicians also appear, including Ian Stanley (formerly of Tears for Fears), and one-time Pretenders guitarist Robbie McIntosh, who plays alongside Hynde and Seymour on "I'm a Mother". The album marked the official return of Chambers, who had been fired by Hynde eight years prior.

In addition to a cover of "Forever Young" the band previously recorded for the film With Honors and was also featured in the closing credits to Free Willy 2: The Adventure Home, the album featured several songs Hynde co-wrote with the songwriting team of Billy Steinberg and Kelly, who wrote several hits for other musicians. That collaboration resulted in singles "Night In My Veins" and "I'll Stand By You" with the latter becoming a hit.

Track listing
"Hollywood Perfume" (Chrissie Hynde, Billy Steinberg, Tom Kelly) – 3:55
"Night in My Veins" (Hynde, Steinberg, Kelly) – 3:15
"Money Talk" (Hynde) – 3:38
"977" (Hynde, Steinberg, Kelly) – 3:54
"Revolution" (Hynde) – 4:32
"All My Dreams" (Hynde) – 3:12
"I'll Stand by You" (Hynde, Steinberg, Kelly) – 3:59
"I'm a Mother" (Hynde, J.F.T. Hood) – 5:18
"Tequila" (Hynde) – 1:13
"Every Mother's Son" (Hynde) – 3:41
"Rebel Rock Me" (Hynde) – 3:08
"Love Colours" (Hynde, Steinberg, Kelly) – 4:32
"Forever Young" (Bob Dylan) – 5:04

Note: The version of "Tequila" presented here is an arrangement of a fragment of the song. Full versions can be heard on the two-CD version of Pretenders and the Pirate Radio box set, as well as the 1995 single release of "2000 Miles" and "Happy Christmas".

Personnel
Chrissie Hynde – guitar (1–3, 5–12), vocals
Adam Seymour – guitar (1–13)
Andy Hobson – bass guitar (1, 6, 13)
Martin Chambers – drums (3, 4, 6, 12)
Robbie McIntosh – guitar (8)
Andy Rourke – bass guitar (2, 3, 5, 9–12)
Ian Stanley – organ (5), special effects (2), keyboards (8)
J.F.T. Hood – drums (1, 7, 13), special effects (8)
Jim Copley – drums (2, 5, 8–11)
David Paton – bass guitar (7)
Tom Kelly – bass guitar (4), piano (4, 7), guitar (7)
London Gospel Choir – choir (7)
David Lord – string arrangement (7)
Bob Clearmountain, Tony Phillips – mixing
Steve Williams – engineer
Simon Fowler – cover photography

Charts

Certifications and sales

References

The Pretenders albums
1994 albums
Albums produced by Chris Thomas (record producer)
Albums produced by Ian Stanley
Albums produced by Stephen Street
Sire Records albums